Kinder is an unincorporated community in White River Township, Johnson County, Indiana.

History
A post office was established at Kinder in 1886, and remained in operation until it was discontinued in 1902. The community may be named for William Kinder, a pioneer.

Geography

References

Unincorporated communities in Johnson County, Indiana
Unincorporated communities in Indiana
Indianapolis metropolitan area